Bakersfield Airport can refer to multiple airports in or near Bakersfield, California:

Meadows Field , Bakersfield's primary commercial airport, for both domestic and international flights
Bakersfield Municipal Airport , a general aviation airport in Southeast Bakersfield